Marquinho, Paraná is a municipality in the state of Paraná in the Southern Region of Brazil.

History 
The land that would become Marquinho was surveyed by the Indian Francisco Tororó. The founders of the town were José Ribeiro (known as José Grande), Elias Ribeiro, João Ribeiro, Hipólito Ribeiro, Antonio Ribeiro and Pedro Ribeiro.

See also
List of municipalities in Paraná

References

Municipalities in Paraná